Ron Jon Surf Shop is a surfer-style retail store chain founded in 1959 in Ship Bottom, New Jersey by Ron DiMenna. The store specializes in surfing and bodyboarding equipment, and their Cocoa Beach, Florida, store is currently the largest surfing shop in the world. Michele Goodwin is the current president.

Ron Jon Surf Shop has 13 stores nationwide. In addition to the Ship Bottom and Cocoa Beach stores, Ron Jon also operates stores in Orange Beach, Alabama; Orlando, Pensacola, Key West, Jacksonville Beach, Fort Myers, Panama City Beach and Clearwater Beach, Florida; Myrtle Beach, South Carolina; Ocean City, New Jersey; and Ocean City, Maryland. There is also a store on Grand Turk. There is also a Ron Jon store in Cozumel, Mexico. A  store in Orange, California, closed in early 2009. Another store in Sawgrass Mills in Sunrise, Florida, closed in 2019. The corporation also includes one Ron Jon Surf School separately owned and run by Craig Carroll, located in Cocoa Beach, Florida. The company made plans to construct a surf park at the location of the Orlando Ron Jon store, but it has since been canceled, due in part that the schematics for the pool were installed backwards.

The flagship store in Cocoa Beach is open daily and has over 52,000 square feet of retail space.

In popular culture
Ruon-Jian is the name of a fictional character in the animated television series Avatar: The Last Airbender which aired on Nickelodeon between 2005 and 2008.  His name (pronounced Ron-Jon) is humorously derived from the shop, as Ruon-Jian acts and looks like a stereotypical surfer.

Cocoa Beach Surf Museum

Ron Jon Surf Shop also houses the Cocoa Beach Surf Museum at the Cocoa Beach location. This museum contains exhibits highlighting surfing in the East Coast of the United States. It preserves and documents the unique history and culture of East Coast surfing through exhibits and educational events, community outreach programs for all ages, digital archiving activities, and its new oral history project. It highlights surfing history and culture from Cocoa Beach, nationally and internationally, and from differing perspectives, including exhibits that feature the history and lore that defines Cocoa Beach as one of the premier surf towns in the world.

References

External links

Sporting goods retailers of the United States
Swimwear brands
Surfwear brands
Companies based in Brevard County, Florida
Cocoa Beach, Florida
Long Beach Island
American companies established in 1959
Retail companies established in 1959
1959 establishments in New Jersey
Tourist attractions in Brevard County, Florida
Surfing retailers